The Des Plaines River is a river that flows southward for  through southern Wisconsin and northern Illinois in the United States Midwest, eventually meeting the Kankakee River west of Channahon to form the Illinois River, a tributary of the Mississippi River.

Native Americans used the river as transportation route and portage.  When French explorers and missionaries arrived in the 1600s, in what was then the Illinois Country of New France, they named the waterway La Rivière des Plaines (River of the Plane Tree) as they felt that trees on the river resembled the European plane tree.  The local Native Americans showed these early European explorers how to traverse waterways of the Des Plaines watershed to travel from Lake Michigan to the Mississippi River and its valley.

Parts of the river are now part of the Illinois Waterway and the Chicago Area Waterway System.

Course and character

The slow-moving Des Plaines River rises in southern Wisconsin just west of Kenosha adjacent to the Great Lakes Dragway and flows southward primarily through marshland as it crosses into Illinois. The river turns to the east and flows through woodland forest preserve districts in Lake and Cook counties (through Forest Park and the city of Des Plaines), northwest of Chicago. Numerous small fixed dams have been built on the river starting in central Lake County and continuing through Cook County. Eventually, the river turns to the southwest and joins with the Sanitary and Ship Canal in Lockport before flowing through the city of Joliet.  Here it becomes part of the Chicago Area Waterway System and the longer Illinois Waterway.

In the heavily industrialized area around Joliet, dams control the river. Just west of Joliet, the Des Plaines converges with the Kankakee River to form the Illinois River.

Those parts of the Des Plaines River preserved in a mostly natural state are used for conservation and recreation, while substantially altered sections serve as an important industrial waterway and drainage channel. The original course of the riverbed was moved to the west at the town of Lockport during the construction of the Sanitary and Ship Canal in 1905.

According to Chicago Wilderness Magazine, as the Des Plaines River runs  through four Illinois counties, it "changes from prairie creek to a suburban stream, to a large urbanized river, to a major industrial waterway."

Sections of the river in the Lake County and Cook County Forest Preserve districts in Illinois create "a nearly continuous greenway though all of Lake County and the northern section of Cook County." While canoe launching ramps are available, "The lack of ramps for trailered boats makes this long river a quiet, family-friendly river."  This greenway also supports the Des Plaines River Trail, a multi-use trail that roughly follows the course of the Des Plaines River through Lake County and into Cook County.

History

Etymology
The Des Plaines River was named by early French coureurs de bois sometime between the 17th and 18th centuries, after the trees lining the banks of the river.
The word la plaine, in the 18th-century Mississippi Valley dialect of French spoken at the time, referred to either the American sycamore or the red maple, both of which resembled the European plane tree either in their palmate leaves or similar bark. This meaning of plaine survives in Canadian French: Plaine or  Plaine rouge refers to an Acer rubrum and Acer saccharinum is sometimes named a plaine blanche.

The English word for the plane tree came from the 14th century Old French word la plane. Since the later 18th century, the French word for the plane tree has evolved into le platane.  As the Latin name for the plane tree is platanus, this transformation was likely done as a part of the attempts by late 18th-century French academics to change the spelling of many French words to what was perceived as their Latin origins.  A side effect of such action was that the original French meaning of the name applied to the Des Plaines River was obscured.  Today, des Plaines in modern Parisian French literally means "of the plains" or "of the prairie". This has led to confusion about the meaning of the original French name for the Des Plaines River.

Many people today believe that the river was named after the plains and prairies through which the river flows. But, in the 18th-century French dialect, it was more common to use the word "prairie" to indicate a plain, such as Prairie du Rocher in Illinois and Prairie du Chien in Wisconsin.  Also, as noted above, it is more likely that the river was named in reference to the trees rather than the land. The French, like the Native Americans, traveled primarily by waterways rather than overland. The view of the prairie was nearly always blocked by trees.  To this day a large number of both maples and sycamores grow along the Des Plaines River.

Although the original French name for the river has survived, its pronunciation has been altered. Today, locals pronounce it in an anglicized way (roughly "dess plains"), rather than according to the French pronunciation. It is also commonly referred to as "The DPR" by locals, citing its initials.

Tributaries 
Northeast of Bristol, Wisconsin, Brighton creek flows into the river.

Jerome Creek and the Root River both converge with the Des Plaines near Pleasant Prairie, Wisconsin.

Mill Creek of Old Mill Creek flows through County Forest Preserve before entering the Des Plaines River.

Another tributary of the river near the Illinois-Wisconsin border is Osprey Lake, in Gurnee, Illinois, which flows through a small unnamed creek before dumping into the river.

Bull Creek in Libertyville, Illinois flows into the Des Plaines near Independence Grove Forest Preserve.

In Lincolnshire, Illinois, Indian creek flows eastward into the Des Plaines River.

Near Chicago Executive Airport, the Wheeling Drainage Ditch of Wheeling, Illinois flows southeast through the town and adds to the river.

McDonald Creek in Mount Prospect, Illinois flows into the Des Plaines in Dam No. 2 Woods.

Southeast of Mount Prospect and due north of Des Plaines, Illinois, Weller Creek flows south into the DPR.

Half a mile east of O'Hare International Airport, Crystal Creek meanders its way into the Des Plaines.

Salt Creek of Hollywood, a neighborhood in Brookfield, Illinois flows downstream into the river.

As the Des Plaines river begins to run parallel to the Chicago Sanitary and Ship Canal, Portage Creek enters the river.

Northwest of Lemont, Illinois, Goose Lake flows directly into the Des Plaines River.

The Des Plaines and the Sanitary and Ship Canal finally merge on the edges of Crest Hill, Illinois.

Hickory Creek flows into the Des Plaines at the bottom of the Brandon Road Dam.

Rock Run, Cedar Creek, and Jackson Creek all flow into the river near the border of Joliet, Illinois and Channahon, Illinois east of I-55.

The DuPage River merges with the Des Plaines in Channahon, Illinois.

About three miles downstream, the Kankakee River merges with the Des Plaines River to form the Illinois River.

Des Plaines River Bridge

The Des Plaines River Bridge in Joliet is a cantilever bridge that is six lanes wide—three lanes traveling eastbound and westbound.  The bridge is signed as part of Interstate 80. The bridge is located on the south side of Joliet.

Flood control projects
A Tunnel and Reservoir Plan (the Chicago Deep Tunnel) to reduce the harmful effects of floods and the flushing of raw sewage into Lake Michigan is semi-operational. It diverts storm water and sewage into temporary holding reservoirs.  The megaproject is one of the largest civil engineering projects ever undertaken in terms of scope, cost and timeframe.  Commissioned in the mid-1970s, the project is managed by the Metropolitan Water Reclamation District of Greater Chicago.  Completion of the system is not anticipated until 2029, but substantial portions of the system have opened.

A modern flood control study stated that flooding on the Des Plaines River has caused significant damage and adverse economic impacts. The greatest recorded flood, in September 1986, caused an estimated $35 million in damage to 10,000 dwellings and 263 business and industrial sites. A Phase I flood control Project was authorized under the Water Resources Development Act of 1999. Project features include levee, dam, and reservoir expansion at a total cost of $50.5 million (in 2002).

Crime
In the six months prior to his December 1978 arrest, serial killer John Wayne Gacy discarded the remains of at least four of his thirty-three known victims into the river, after finding no other suitable locations to dispose of them, due to the further twenty-nine known victims being buried in the crawlspace or other locations upon the grounds of his home.

Recreation
The Des Plaines River is the site of the Des Plaines River Canoe & Kayak Marathon. The race was founded in 1957 by Ralph Frese, and is the second oldest continual canoe race in the United States. Fishing is a common practice along the Des Plaines River with a steady game fish population of bluegills, carp, catfish, crappie, largemouth bass, northern pike, smallmouth bass and sunfish.

See also
Asian carp in North America
Des Plaines River Trail

References

External links

2000 Des Plaines River Watershed Orthophotography (by Illinois State Geological Survey)
Des Plaines River Wetlands Demonstration Project
Upper Des Plaines River Canoe Routes
 Des Plaines River Canoe & Kayak Marathon

Rivers of Illinois
Rivers of Wisconsin
Tributaries of the Illinois River
Rivers of Kenosha County, Wisconsin
Rivers of Lake County, Illinois
Rivers of Cook County, Illinois
Rivers of Will County, Illinois